The English Tea House and Restaurant is an English tea house and restaurant that is located in Sandakan, Sabah, Malaysia, on a little hill overlooking the Sulu Sea off the Sandakan Bay.

History 

The tea house was opened on 8 December 2002, with the building architecture inspired by the former house of the American author, Agnes Newton Keith that is situated not far from the tea house.

Decoration 
The building is built based on the English colonial architecture and is surrounded by 1.5 acres of manicured lawn, complete with a croquet pitch and outdoor seating.

Services 
The restaurant offers traditional English cuisine as well as Asian cuisine.

See also 
 List of tea houses

References

External links 
 

Tea houses
English culture
Tourist attractions in Sabah
Buildings and structures in Sandakan